Habib Benglia (1895–1960) was an Algerian-born film actor who settled in France. He was the first French-African actor to land major roles in both cinema (he acted in Renoir and Pujol movies among others) and theater (performing in over 100 plays).

Selected filmography
 Yasmina (1927)
 Alone (1931)
 You Will Be a Duchess (1932)
 The Mysteries of Paris (1935)
 Nitchevo (1936)
 The Secrets of the Red Sea (1937)
 Storm Over Asia (1938)
 Les Enfants du Paradis (1945)
 The Dancer of Marrakesh (1949)
 Tom Toms of Mayumba (1955)
 A Missionary (1955)
 The Roots of Heaven (1958)
 Certains l'aiment froide (1960)
 Candide (1960)

References

Bibliography
 Sylvie Chalaye, Du Noir au Nègre, l'image du Noir au théâtre (1550-1960), Paris, L'Harmattan, 1998. 
 Nathalie Coutelet, « Habib Benglia: quand le Noir entre en scène », Présence africaine, n° 170, 2004, pp. 189–209.
 Nathalie Coutelet, « Habib Benglia et le cinéma colonial », Cahiers d'études africaines, n° 191, 2008, pp. 531–548.
 Jean-Philippe Dedieu, « Les comédiens. Universalisme ou protectionnisme artistique ? », La parole immigrée. Les migrants africains dans l'espace public en France (1960-1995) , Paris, Klincksieck, 2012, pp. 149–187.
 Miliani Hadj, « Diasporas musiciennes et migrations maghrébines en situation coloniale », Volume, n° 2, 2015, pp. 155–169.
 Susan Hayward, French Costume Drama of the 1950s: Fashioning Politics in Film, Chicago, Chicago Press University, 2010.
 Lucien Lemoine, « Maître, prenez la parole », Présence Africaine, n° 3, 1995, pp. 35–47.

External links

1895 births
1960 deaths
French male film actors
Migrants from French Algeria to France
People from Oran